Eden Star (stylized as EDEN STAR) is an action-adventure survival video game developed and published by Flix Interactive. It was released into early access on 30 January 2015 for Microsoft Windows and is currently in Steam's early access program.

References

Upcoming video games
Early access video games
Windows games
Windows-only games
Action-adventure games
Survival video games
Unreal Engine games
Multiplayer and single-player video games
Video games developed in the United Kingdom